This is a list of airports in Kiribati, sorted by location.

Kiribati, officially the Republic of Kiribati, is an island nation located in the central tropical Pacific Ocean. It is composed of 32 atolls  and one raised coral island, dispersed over  straddling the equator, and bordering the International Date Line to the east.



Airports 

Kiribati has 23 airports, of which 21 are recognised by IATA and/or ICAO. Of these, two are international airports and 20 provide scheduled domestic airline service.
One airport, Hawkins Field, in Betio, has been dismantled since 1946.

Airports

See also 
 Transport in Kiribati
 List of airports by ICAO code: N#NG - Kiribati (Gilbert Islands), Tuvalu
 List of airports by ICAO code: P#PC - Kiribati (Canton Airfield, Phoenix Islands)
 List of airports by ICAO code: P#PL - Line Islands (Kiribati (eastern) and U.S. territories)
 Wikipedia: WikiProject Aviation/Airline destination lists: Oceania#Kiribati

References 
 
  - includes IATA codes
 Great Circle Mapper: Kiribati - ICAO and IATA codes

Kiribati
 
Kiribati
Airports